KGIR (1220 AM, "ESPN 1220/1470") is a radio station licensed to serve Cape Girardeau, Missouri, United States.  The station is owned by Max Media and licensed to MRR License LLC. It airs a sports format in conjunction with KMAL and featuring programming from ESPN Radio.

The station was assigned the KGIR call letters by the Federal Communications Commission on March 29, 1996.

KGIR has an FCC construction permit for a new FM translator in Cape Girardeau, Missouri; it will broadcast on the frequency of 93.5 MHz with the call letters K228FX.

Ownership
In December 2003, Mississippi River Radio, acting as Max Media LLC (John Trinder, president/COO), reached an agreement to purchase WCIL, WCIL-FM, WJPF, WOOZ-FM, WUEZ, WXLT, KCGQ-FM, KEZS-FM, KGIR, KGKS, KJEZ, KKLR-FM, KLSC, KMAL, KSIM, KWOC, and KZIM from the Zimmer Radio Group (James L. Zimmer, owner). The reported value of this 17 station transaction was $43 million.

History
In the 1930s, the call letters KGIR belonged to a station in Butte, Montana, broadcasting on 1360 kHz with 500 watts of power.

References

External links
KGIR official website

GIR
ESPN Radio stations
Cape Girardeau, Missouri
Radio stations established in 1966
Max Media radio stations
1996 establishments in Missouri